Welded wire mesh fence is a steel fence consisting of wire strands electrically welded together to form a high strength mesh. The fencing is available in two formats: rolled mesh and rigid mesh. Over the last 30 years rigid mesh fencing has become the system of choice for demarcation across the UK, Europe and Australia. 

The rigid mesh system has proven popular, and is now a first choice on many types of projects including construction, civil, utilities and temporary works.

Welded wire mesh fences are used predominantly as high security barriers where visibility through the fence is necessary or desirable. It is also used for animal enclosures in zoos.

The longest stretch of rigid mesh fencing in the UK is on the Norton Bridge Flyover, with a continuous fence of 5.5 km.

Types

Styles 
 Profiled Rigid Mesh Panels
 Double-Wire Rigid Mesh Panels (also known as Twin Wire)
 358 Prison Mesh Panels

Finishes
Powder coating
Galvanization
Painted or sprayed
Stainless steel

By gauge
Wire thickness: typically wire from 2mm to 8mm is used
Horizontal wire pitch: the distance between two horizontal wire strands, typically 12.7mm to 200mm
Vertical wire pitch: the distance between two vertical wire strands, typically 10mm to 76.2mm

Uses
Around public buildings, such as the Union Buildings in Pretoria
Around private offices, where visibility is desirable
Residential perimeter fence
Around prisons, secure hospitals and military installations
Country borders
In parks, zoos and nature reserves

References

Fences